Hanson Ferry was a town in Asotin County, Washington. The GNIS classifies it as a populated place.

A post office called Hanson Ferry operated from 1891 to 1929. The community was named after John Hansen, an early settler.

References

Ghost towns in Washington (state)
Geography of Asotin County, Washington